The Serb Civic Initiative is a political party in Kosovo.

History

2004 election
At the legislative elections held on 24 October 2004, the party won 369 votes (0.05% of the popular vote) and 2 out of 120 seats.

2013
In 2013, the political party was forced by the government of Republic of Kosovo to change name in order to join the elections, as using the word "Serbia" was not allowed.

References

Serb political parties in Kosovo